The Italo-Ethiopian War of 1887–1889 was an undeclared war between the Kingdom of Italy and the Ethiopian Empire occurring during the Italian colonization of Eritrea. The conflict ended with a treaty of friendship, which delimited the border between Ethiopia and Italian Eritrea but contained clauses whose different interpretations led to another Italo-Ethiopian war.

As the Mahdist uprising in the Sudan spilled over the frontier, Ethiopia was faced with a two-front war. The Emperor Yohannes IV also had to face internal resistance from his powerful vassals. King Menelik of Shewa even signed a treaty of neutrality with Italy in October 1887.

While there is universal agreement that the war began in January 1887, historians differ about when it ended. Some limit the war to 1887, others extend it down to the Treaty of Wuchale in 1889, and others combine it with the Italo-Ethiopian War of 1895–1896 and treat a single conflict as occurring from 1887 until 1896. The naming of the conflict also varies. It may be called the First Italo-Ethiopian War and the war of 1895–1896 as the Second Italo-Ethiopian War. Otherwise it may be identified solely by date.

Italian historiography tends to group together all the fighting from 1885 until 1896. The original name for the fighting was Guerra d'Africa (African War), a term which indicates the broad perceived scope of early Italian colonial ambitions. As the Italian historian Giuseppe Finaldi puts it, "The war is called the Guerra d'Africa, not the Guerra d'Eritrea or such like."

Background
The first Italian colony in what was to become the colony of Eritrea was Assab Bay, purchased by Giuseppe Sapeto on behalf of the Società di Navigazione Rubattino (Rubattino Shipping Company) on 15 November 1869 from the brothers Ibrahim and Hassan Ben Ahmed for 6,000 Maria Theresa thalers. The Suez Canal opened two days later. The deal was later finalised for 8,350 thalers and with the Sultan Abd Allah Sahim as a party. On 11 March 1870, Sapeto purchased the Bay of Buya from the same brothers and sultan. Between 15 April 1870 and December 1879, however, Assab went unused by the company. The company offered it to the Italian government, which on 5 July 1882 passed a law making it Italy's first colony.

The outbreak of the Mahdist uprising changed the political situation in the Horn of Africa. Egypt was unable to maintain its garrison in Massawa and, with British approval, an Italian Corpo Speciale per l'Africa (Special Corps for Africa), commanded by Colonel Tancredi Saletta, occupied it on 5 February 1885.

Campaign

Dogali campaign

Italian moves into the hinterland of Massawa, territory claimed by Ethiopia, brought her forces into conflict with those of Ethiopia, specifically those of Ras Alula, governor of Mareb Mellash.

On 24 or 25 January 1887, Alula attacked the Italian fort at Saati. In the ensuing skirmish, his troops were beaten back. The battle of Dogali turned out to be one of the most important in the history of modern Ethiopia. Alula did not follow up his victory, preferring to wait for permission from Yohannes to continue. He entered Asmara on 31 January 1887.

The response to Dogali in Italy was immediate. The Italian parliament voted 5,000,000 lire for troops to reinforce Massawa. An Italian force  was sent to garrison the interior, while Yohannes IV withdrew his forces to avoid confrontation. Disease ravaged the Italian troops and they were pulled out in March 1887, ending the first phase of the war.

Following his victory, Alula remained in contact with the Italians regarding prisoners. He also subjected Massawa to a landward blockade in an effort to completely cut off its trade with the hinterland. This angered the local Muslim traders, whose sympathies shifted towards the Italians.

In his attack on Saati, Alula had acted entirely on his own initiative. The Emperor Yohannes was at Makelle during the battle of Dogali. When Alula requested permission to expel the Italians from Massawa, the emperor is said to have castigated him for making war without permission: "Who gave you permission to go and make war there? Those soldiers are not yours but mine; I shall cut off your hand." In late March, Yohannes summoned Alula to Makelle, where he was more conciliatory He promised the ras reinforcements against any Italian counterattack but forbade offensive operations.

Italian reinforcements and alliance with Shewa
On 2 June 1887, the Italian parliament voted a further 200,000,000 lire for troops, ammunition and supplies to be sent to Massawa. During the summer, an expeditionary force of 20,000 men was assembled in Italy. It landed in Massawa during November.

With Yohannes weakened, Menelik of Shewa and King Tekle Haymanot of Gojjam entered into an alliance against him. In retaliation, the emperor crossed into Gojjam in early August 1887 and devastated it. The following month, he ordered Menelik to bar communications with Assab through Aussa. In response, Menelik sent letters to both the emperor and the Italians offering to mediate, as he had done after Dogali.

Already in late August 1887, Menelik had received the Italian diplomat Pietro Antonelli in Shewa to negotiate an alliance against Yohannes. Italy requested a small piece of territory in the interior in which to garrison their troops during the summer. Antonelli also gave Menelik Italy's justifications for a punitive expedition to avenge Dogali. On 19 September, Antonelli proposed a treaty of neutrality with Shewa in exchange for munitions. A draft of this treaty survives. Nevertheless, in early October 1887, Yohannes wrote to Matewos, bishop of Shewa, who was with the Shewan court at Mount Entoto, that he was determined to go to war against Italy.

On 20 October 1887, however, Menelik signed a secret treaty with Antonelli guaranteeing his neutrality in return for arms. Within six months he was to receive 5,000 Remington rifles. In the treaty, Italy renounced any intention of annexing Ethiopian territory.

Campaign of Ras Alula
In September 1887, Alula invaded Damot with a Tigrayan army. With their ras away, the Tigrayan chiefs made contact with the Italians. On 11 November 1887, Gerald Portal, the British consul at Cairo, met Alula at Asmara. He then met Yohannes encamped by Lake Ashangi on 7 December. He conveyed to the emperor his government's opinion that the attack on Saati had been "unjust" and urged that Alula be removed as governor of Mareb Mellash. Yohannes refused to concede anything to the Italians: "If they cannot live there [at Massawa] without Saati, let them go." He also defended Ras Alula, saying that "[he] did no wrong; the Italians came into the province under his governorship and he fought them, just as you [the British] would fight the Abyssinians [Ethiopians] if they came to England."

By January 1888, the Italians had moved two brigades up to Dogali. Yohannes mobilised for war. In December 1887, he had ordered Menelik to guard Wollo and Begemder, while Ras Mikael brought up 25,000 Oromo cavalry to Tigray. Facing a Mahdist invasion in the west, Yohannes abandoned his campaign in March. Paul Henze suggests that "personal antipathy to Islam and desire to see the Mahdist rebellion contained must ... have carried weight in his decision to give priority to the war against the Mahdists over defense against Italian encroachment." In February–March 1888 Menelik, on Yohannes' orders, marched his army west to Gondar to defend it from the Mahdists. He did not arrive in time and Gondar was sacked.

With Yohannes out of the fighting against Italy, Alula withdrew to Asmara in early April 1888 and retreated to Adwa on 23 April. Although Asmara was left undefended, the Italians did not move on it. In May 1888, the Italian expeditionary force in the north withdrew, having never progressed far from the coast. The rifles promised to Menelik in the treaty of October arrived in Assab that same month, but were withheld. In order to free up the weapons, Menelik signed a second treaty with Antonelli in early July 1888. He also made an alliance with Tekle Haymanot against Yohannes, who ravaged Gojjam in early August. The emperor was joined by Alula in September. The Italian then supplied the promised arms to Menelik in case the emperor followed through on his threat to invade Shewa. With Ethiopia on the verge of civil war, the Italians occupied Keren on 6 February 1889. Dejazmach Dabbab Araya, governor of Akele Guzay, occupied Asmara on 9 February 1889 on his own initiative.

Treaty of Wuchale
In the vacuum that followed the death of Yohannes IV in the Battle of Gallabat against the Mahdists on 10/11 March 1889, General Oreste Baratieri occupied the highlands along the Eritrean coast and Italy proclaimed the establishment of the new colony of Italian Eritrea. The Italian possession of maritime areas previously claimed by Ethiopia was formalized on 2 May 1889 with the signing of the Treaty of Wuchale with the new emperor, Menelik of Shewa. It was a compromise: while Ethiopia had been successful in the field, the Italians had managed to occupy territory and retreat in an orderly way. They retained their acquisitions on the Red Sea. Menelik recognized the Italian occupation of his rivals' lands of Bogos, Hamasien, Akkele Guzay and Serae in exchange for guarantees of financial assistance and continuing access to European arms and ammunition.

Casualties
Both sides had taken large losses. Sources about the Italian casualties reported 430 killed at Dogali and 1,000 overall, while the Ethiopians suffered perhaps as little as 400 overall or as much as 730 at Dogali alone.

References

Sources

1887 in Italy
Conflicts in 1887
Wars involving Ethiopia
Wars involving Italy
African resistance to colonialism